Josef "Sepp" Brandstetter (7 November 1891 – 25 March 1945) was an Austrian amateur football (soccer) player.

International career
He was a member of the Austrian Olympic squad at the 1912 Summer Olympics and played two matches in the main tournament as well as three matches in the consolation tournament.

For the Austria national football team he played 42 games and scored 2 goals.

Management
Brandstetter was also a team coach. Clubs managed include HŠK Građanski Zagreb, Wiener Sport-Club and SpVgg Hard.

Honours
Austrian Championship (8):
 1912, 1913, 1916, 1917, 1919, 1920, 1921, 1923
Austrian Cup (2):
 1919, 1920

External links
SK Rapid profile

References

1891 births
1945 deaths
Austrian footballers
Austria international footballers
Olympic footballers of Austria
Footballers at the 1912 Summer Olympics
SK Rapid Wien players
HŠK Građanski Zagreb managers
Expatriate football managers in Yugoslavia
Wiener Sport-Club managers
Footballers from Vienna
Association football midfielders
Austrian football managers